Gregory John Retallack (born 8 November 1951) is an Australian paleontologist, geologist, and author who specializes in the study of fossil soils (paleopedology). His research has examined the fossil record of soils though major events in Earth history, extending back some 4.6 billion years. Among his publications he has written two standard paleopedology textbooks, said N. Jones in Nature Geoscience "Retallack has literally written the book on ancient soils."

Biography 
Retallack moved with his family from Hobart, Tasmania at age 4. He grew up in Hurstville and then Epping, in the suburbs of Sydney. He attended The King's School, Parramatta, then studied biology and paleontology at Macquarie University. He received a BSc Hons with University Medal in 1974 from the University of New England (Australia) and a PhD in 1978 in geology from the same university. After a postdoctoral fellowship at Indiana University he joined the faculty at the University of Oregon in 1981. He was a professor in the Department of Geological Sciences since 1992, and Director of the Condon Collection of the University of Oregon Museum of Natural and Cultural History since 2009. Since retirement in 2022 he has been a professor emeritus.

A fossil collector since the age of 6, Retallack was outspoken concerning federal seizure in 1993 of Sue (dinosaur) the skeleton of Tyrannosaurus rex excavated by Pete Larson.

Work

Evolution of life on land 

In 1973, Retallack discovered that paleosols were preserved among fossil roots below some kinds of fossil plant horizons and that paleosols could reveal aspects of plant communities difficult to infer from the fossil plants themselves. This novel approach to reconstructing life on land could be applied to understanding major events in evolution, sometimes supplementing and sometimes challenging prior understanding.  Initial work was on Triassic vegetation and climate. Later construction of Cenozoic paleoclimate time series led to the idea that grassland-grazer coevolution was responsible for climatic cooling over the past 50 million years, which has implications for biosequestration of carbon. Fieldwork in Kenya on paleosols associated with apes (Proconsulidae) ancestral to humans revealed that the evolutionary transition to upright stance occurred in woodlands rather than savannas. Paleosols of the Cretaceous-Paleogene boundary in Montana implicated abrupt paleoclimatic change and acid rain from extraterrestrial impact in the extinction of dinosaurs 
Work on the Permian-Triassic boundary in Antarctica lead to formulation of an hypothesis of greenhouse crisis due to methane outburst associated with flood basalt in this greatest of all mass extinctions 
Devonian fossil soils at sites for tetrapods suggest a woodland hypothesis for the evolutionary transition from fish to amphibian.

Retallack discovered fossil soils at classical South Australian sites for the Ediacara biota and reported it is evidence that these fossils formerly regarded as marine were instead terrestrial organisms such as lichens, slime molds and microbial colonies. Retallack has also reinterpreted volcanic tuffs of Newfoundland as terrestrial lapilli and sanidine tuffs, and so found fossiliferous Ediacaran paleosols there as well 
 
A Paleoproterozoic paleosol with problematic fossils (Diskagma) comparable with the living Geosiphon (a fungus) could suggest a long evolutionary history for life on land.
Diskagma from South Africa is as old as 2.2 billion years, pushing back the arrival of life on land much further than the previous record of 1.2 billion years. Such putative ancient and complex life on land could support the view that life originated in soil.

Retallack's work on Late Permian mass extinction was featured on several television documentaries, including the BBC's The Day The Earth Nearly Died and Science Channel USA's Miracle Planet episode "Death and Rebirth". His work on Miocene of Panama was featured in National Geographic Channel USA's "Terror Raptor" episode of Prehistoric Predators. Radio interviews concerning his recent work on early life on land were broadcast by Richard Harris for National Public Radio, Bob McDonald for Canadian Broadcast Corporation and Dave Miller for Oregon Public Broadcasting.

In a challenge to young earth creationism, Retallack debunked interpretation of the fossil forests of Yellowstone National Park as deposits of volcanic lahars in which tree trunks landed upright, by showing that the fossil stumps were rooted in moderately developed paleosols. Because moderate development of soils can take as long as 5000 years, only a few paleosols in succession are needed to exceed the young earth creationism age of the Earth, and at Yellowstone there are at least 24 successive fossil forests. Sequences of paleosols is just one of many lines of physical evidence that young earth creationism does not explain as well as conventional geology.

Paleobotany 

In addition to paleopedology, Retallack continues research in paleobotany. His special interests include Triassic fossil plants such as Pleuromeia, Isoetes, Dicroidium and Lepidopteris. With David Dilcher he developed a coastal hypothesis for the dispersal and rise to dominance of angiosperms. Retallack also developed new techniques for using stomatal index of fossil Ginkgo leaves to obtain past atmospheric carbon dioxide. This work led Retallack to propose the concept of paleoenvironmental regulation by the Proserpina Principle: plants cool the planet, whereas animals warm it.
Retallack's name is honored by several fossils including Cladophlebis retallackii, fossil fern foliage, Sapindopsis retallackii early angiosperm leaves and Hypisodus retallacki, a fossil mouse deer.

Archeology 

In a study of soils at 84 temples of Classical Greece, Retallack discovered that each deity and cult was associated with a particular kind of soil, suggesting an economic basis for Greek polytheism. Dionysos and Demeter, for example, were gods of farming, Hermes and Hera gods of pastoralists and Apollo and Artemis gods of nomadic hunter-gatherers

Boards 

Retallack has served as an associate or technical editor for such scientific journals as Geology, PALAIOS, and Journal of Sedimentary Research. His fellowships include the Geological Society of America, and the American Association for the Advancement of Science.

He served as the president and vice president of the Cordilleran Section of the Paleontological Society, of the Oregon Academy of Sciences, and of the University of Oregon Chapter of the Society of Sigma Xi.

Critical reception 

Early reviews of Retallack's textbooks have been positive. Of Soils of the Past, David Fastovsky concludes "it is requisite for all persons trying to understand paleosols". Of A Colour Guide to Paleosols, Daniel Yaalon concludes "Highly recommended for students and researchers alike for an introductory insight to paleopedology and to whet and refine their skills in paleosol interpretation." Both reviews however baulked at the unfamiliarity of soil science terminology and classification in these texts.

Retallack's approach to the description and interpretation of paleosols has been widely adopted. Some controversy concerned use of modern soil taxonomies for paleosols, but Retallack's approach has since been validated by development of additional geochemical proxies for soil taxonomic criteria. Retallack's confirmation of abrupt paleoenvironmental change on land at the Cretaceous-Tertiary and Permian-Triassic boundaries, have been supported by later research on extinction.

Retallack's initial taphonomy work interpreting some Ediacaran biota as lichens was questioned for its applicability to all Ediacaran fossils. The recent Retallack proposal that Ediacaran fossils were preserved in paleosols and thus could not be marine fossils, is a provocative challenge to prior interpretations, and has been supported in some quarters, but disputed in others. However this hypothesis of Retallack is not universally accepted by the paleontological community. Nature called it a "controversial claim" in a news report, in which paleontologist Guy Narbonne said "Most of us appreciated that Retallack's lichen hypothesis was innovative thinking and tested his ideas critically, but it quickly became clear that there are simpler explanations for the features Retallack had validly noted, and most of us moved on to more promising explanations."

Awards and honors 

Retallack has been honored for his research, including the Stillwell Award of the Geological Society of Australia, for best paper in the society journal in 1977, Ingerson Award of the Geochemical Society in 2015, and the Antarctica Service Medal of the U.S. National Science Foundation in 1999.  He has been an invited lecturer throughout the U.S., and also to Germany, England, China, Thailand and India.

Bibliography 

Textbooks

 Soils of the past: an introduction to paleopedology, 3rd edition, Wiley, Chichester, 2019, 
 A colour guide to paleosols, John Wiley and Sons, Chichester, 1997, 
 Soil grown tall: the epic saga of life from earth, Springer Nature, Cham, Switzerland, 2022, 

Selected publications

References

External links 

Personal web page

1951 births
American paleontologists
University of Oregon faculty
American geologists
Living people
Fellows of the Geological Society of America
People from Hobart
People educated at The King's School, Parramatta
Macquarie University alumni
University of New England (Australia) alumni
Indiana University alumni
Australian geologists
Australian paleontologists